Ioanna Kuçuradi (born October 4, 1936) is a Turkish philosopher from Istanbul.  She is currently the president of Philosophical Society of Turkey and a full-time academic of Maltepe University.

Biography
Of Greek (Rûm) descent, Kuçuradi was born on October 4, 1936 in Istanbul, Turkey. After finishing Zappeion Greek Gymnasium for Girls in Istanbul in 1954, she studied philosophy at Istanbul University, from where she graduated with a B.A. degree in 1959. She earned a Ph.D. degree at the same university in 1965. Ioanna Kuçuradi worked as an assistant professor at her alma mater and the Atatürk University in Erzurum.

She was founder and head of the Department of Philosophy at Hacettepe University. From 1997 to 2005, Kuçuradi was founding director of the Centre for Research and Application of the Philosophy of Human Rights at Hacettepe University. She is also holder of a UNESCO Chair of Philosophy since 1998. Since 2006, Kuçuradi teaches philosophy and acts as director of the Centre for Research and Application of Human Rights at Maltepe University.

Honours
Kuçuradi has received numerous honors, among which:
 Goethe-Medaille (1996)
 Doctor honoris causa, University of Crete, Greece (1996)
 Prize of the Turkish Academy of Sciences (1996)
 Hacettepe University Prize for Scientific Achievement (Academic years 1994-1995 and 1995–1996)
 Doctor honoris causa, Lima, Peru (2000)
 Freedom of the Press 1999 Prize of the Journalists Association of Turkey (2000)
 Grosses Verdienstkreuz des Verdienstordens der Bundesrepublik Deutschland Knight Commander of the Order of Merit of Germany (2001)
 Honourable Mention, UNESCO Human Rights Education Prize (2002)
 Huésped Ilustra de la Ciudad de La Habana (2002)
 Mustafa N. Parlar Prize for Scientific Achievement, Parlar Foundation Science Award, Ankara, Turkey (2003)
 UNESCO Aristotle Medaille (2003)
 Diyarbakır Medical Association's Prize for Peace, Friendship and Democracy (2004)
 Council of Secular Humanism's Planetary Humanist Philosopher's Award (2005)
 Honorary Fellow, The Science Academy Society of Turkey, Istanbul (2015)

References

External links
 Official website of Phılosophıcal Socıety of Turkey

1936 births
Turkish people of Greek descent
Istanbul University alumni
Academic staff of Hacettepe University
Academic staff of Maltepe University
Turkish non-fiction writers
20th-century Turkish philosophers
21st-century philosophers
Commanders Crosses of the Order of Merit of the Federal Republic of Germany
Living people
Turkish women academics
Turkish women philosophers
METU Mustafa Parlar Foundation Science Award winners